Palwasha Behram Khan is a Pakistani politician who's Senator and  served as a member of the National Assembly of Pakistan.

She was elected as Senator Government of Pakistan in March 2021

Political career
She was elected to the National Assembly of Pakistan from Punjab as a candidate of Pakistan Peoples Party (PPP) on a seat reserved for women in the 2008 Pakistani general election.

On 4 November 2018, she was appointed as deputy information secretary of PPP by Bilawal Bhutto Zardari.

On 3 March 2021, she was elected as Senator (Upper House of Pakistan) Government of Pakistan for 6 years term.

References

Pakistan People's Party MNAs
Living people
Pakistani MNAs 2008–2013
People from Chakwal District
Pakistani Senators 2021–2027
1976 births